Padre Íñigo Bridge (Spanish: Puente Padre Íñigo), also known as the Coamo Bridge (Puente de Coamo) or Bridge #174, is a historic lattice girder bridge that crosses the Coamo River in the municipality of the same name in southern Puerto Rico. It was added to the United States National Register of Historic Places in 1995.

The bridge, built between 1853 and 1879, is the earliest extant multi-span lattice girder bridge and the only one with continuous girders in Puerto Rico. Its foundations consist of precious wood piles 3 meters deep. Designed by engineer Raymundo Campubri, a noted builder-designer, it was manufactured by Eugene Rollin & Co. in Belgium for 29,590 francs. The 70-ton structure was brought from Europe aboard the ship Galeon. The bridge was built as part of the old Carretera Central, the first highway across the Cordillera Central mountain range. The bridge is now only open to pedestrians and a new bridge built in 1983 bypasses it today.

References 

Bridges completed in 1879
Road bridges on the National Register of Historic Places in Puerto Rico
1870s establishments in Puerto Rico
Coamo, Puerto Rico
1879 establishments in the Spanish Empire
Girder bridges